Ngāriki Kaipūtahi, Ngāriki Kaiputahi or Te Iwi o Ngāriki Kaipūtahi is a Māori iwi (tribe) in the Mangatu area of Gisborne District, New Zealand. Its present-day members are all descended from Rawiri Tamanui.

The rohe (tribal area) of the tribe includes the Mangatu, Manukawhitikitiki, Whatatutu and Mangaotane Blocks, the Te Rata, Mangaotane, Waipaoa and the Mangatu rivers and tributaries, the Raukumara Ranges, the Arowhana mountain, and the Motu River on the boundaries of Mangaotane.

History

Early history

Ngāriki Kaipūtahi is a sovereign tribe with its own lands, laws, traditions and form of government centered on an ancient pattern of Ariki (High Born) and Rangatira (leaders) of chiefly lineage. The origins of Ngāriki Kaipūtahi people claim a literal descent from the four Ariki (Lords) of the Heavens: Ariki, Ariki Nui, Ariki Roa, and Ariki Tawhito. Then when the Ariki descended to earth the lineage continued down through the children of the Ariki who are the earliest inhabitants of Aotearoa, pre-dating by some 500 years the contemporary concept of 'Te Māori', the Maori people, as connected to the major waka migrations of the "Great Fleet".

While there have been a few tribes descended from or recognizing the Ariki tradition, including Nga Ariki (of Ngati Apa), Ngariki Rotoawe (Turanga - no longer existent), Ngariki Po (Turanga - no longer existent), Ngāriki Kaipūtahi are one of remaining active tribes that holds its Mana Motuhake (authority) as direct descendants from these original peoples of Aotearoa called by various names 'Te Ariki', 'Moriori', 'Panenehu', and 'Turehu'. The Mana Motuhake is defined in its parts as: Mana Atua (Authority from the Gods) through the four Ariki; Mana Tupuna - an unbroken line of Ariki and Rangatira to the present day generation; Mana Whenua - undisturbed possession of the Mangatu lands for over 700 years;  Mana Tangata - the present day tribal sovereign government.

Modern history

In its contemporary form, Te Iwi o Ngāriki Kaipūtahi consists of 51 whanau (family groups) organized around a central tribal government made up of three branches: Kahui Ariki (judicial), Kahui Rangatira (legislative), and Taua (executive), as established by a constitution on 29 January 2006.

The mihi (introduction) for the iwi is:

Governance

Ngāriki Kaiputahi Whānau Trust

Ngāriki Kaiputahi Whānau Trust is recognised as an iwi authority for the purposes of the Resource Management Act, and represents Ngāriki Kaiputahi hapu in the resource consent process. It is a whānau trust, governed by seven trustees representing six tupuna. As of 2018, the trust is chaired by Owen Lloyd and based at Te Karaka. The Crown does not necessarily recognise the iwi, or the trust's authority to act on behalf of the iwi.

Local government

The tribal area of the iwi is within the territory of Gisborne District Council.

See also
List of Māori iwi

References